Amandine Hesse and Victoria Rodríguez were the defending champions, but chose not to participate.

Petra Krejsová and Jesika Malečková won the title after defeating Lucie Hradecká and Michaëlla Krajicek 6–2, 6–1 in the final.

Seeds

Draw

Draw

References
Main Draw

ITS Cup - Doubles
ITS Cup